X is the fourth studio album by Kristeen Young. It is themed around various reversals of, and thoughts on, the Ten Commandments.

The album was produced by Tony Visconti and engineered by Mario J. McNulty at Studio B, Looking Glass Studios.  It features "Baby" Jeff White on drums, David Matos on guitar and a duet with Placebo's Brian Molko on No Other God.

Track listing
"No Other God" (with Brian Molko)– 3:07
"Commit Adultery" – 3:11
"Kill It" – 4:02
"Lie" – 4:01
"Cold Steal" – 4:20
"Goddamn You, You Scenesters" – 3:34
"Yesterday's Future Man" – 4:03
"I Own The Best Of All Things" – 3:29
"My TV" – 4:00
"Devil Girl" – 4:55
"Credits" (read by David Matos) – 1:49
"No Other God' - 3:09

References

Kristeen Young albums
2004 albums
Albums produced by Tony Visconti